Trau, schau, wem! (Take Care in Whom You Trust!), Op. 463, is a waltz composed by Johann Strauss II. The composition was dedicated to the portrait painter Franz von Lenbach. It was based on melodies from Strauss's operetta Waldmeister – the work is therefore also known as "Waldmeister Walzer". It premiered on 15 December 1895 in the Golden Hall of the Vienna Musikverein, conducted by Eduard Strauss.

References

1895 compositions
Waltzes by Johann Strauss II